The Qin River is a tributary of the Yellow River in southeast Shanxi, China. It rises in Qinyuan County, Shanxi, and joins the Yellow River in Wuzhi County, Henan.

Its largest tributary is the Dan River (丹河), which flows through the Gaoping city center. The upper Dan River valley northwest of Gaoping is the site of the ancient battlefields of the infamous Battle of Changping.

References 

Tributaries of the Yellow River
Rivers of Shanxi
Rivers of Henan